The Circle is a 2014 Swiss docudrama film. Written and directed by Stefan Haupt, the film concerns the social network of gay men that developed in Zurich in the 1940s and 1950s, centered on The Circle, a gay publication, and the social events it sponsored. As the police investigate three murders of gay men by rent boys, they scapegoat The Circle and its subscribers for making Zurich an international center of gay tourism.

The film focuses on the story of Ernst Ostertag and Röbi Rapp, a schoolteacher and a drag entertainer, who met through their participation in the publication inner circle and began a lifelong romantic relationship. Interviews with them and other survivors and experts on the era are interspersed with documentary film and photographs as well as a scripted dramatic enactment of the story. The lack of legal proscription against homosexuals and Zurich's growing notoriety provide the context for the growth of a publication that overtly catered to a gay readership while avoiding explicit materials, both in prose and illustrations, in order to meet the standards of Swiss censorship.

The couple are portrayed by Matthias Hungerbühler and Sven Schelker, with documentary interviews with the real Ostertag and Rapp.

Cast 
 Matthias Hungerbühler - Ernst Ostertag
  - Röbi Rapp
 Anatole Taubman - Felix
  - Principal Dr. Max Sieber
 Marianne Sägebrecht - Erika
 Antoine Monot, Jr. - Gian
  - Gabi Gerster
 Stefan Witschi - Rolf

Release
The film won the Teddy Award for Best Documentary at the 2014 Berlin Film Festival, as well as the Panorama Audience Award. North American distribution rights were subsequently acquired by Wolfe Video. It was selected as the Swiss entry for the Best Foreign Language Film at the 87th Academy Awards, but was not nominated. Director Stefan Haupt said "it's an honour to represent Switzerland".

See also
 LGBT history in Switzerland
 List of submissions to the 87th Academy Awards for Best Foreign Language Film
 List of Swiss submissions for the Academy Award for Best Foreign Language Film

References

External links
 

2014 films
2014 documentary films
Swiss drama films
Swiss documentary films
Swiss German-language films
2010s German-language films
2010s French-language films
Docudrama films
2014 LGBT-related films
Documentary films about LGBT topics
LGBT-related drama films
Swiss LGBT-related films
LGBT-related films based on actual events
Gay-related films
2014 drama films